Abu Mohamed Abu Chiaba (born 1947) is a Kenyan politician who has been a member of the Senate of Kenya since 2013 to 2017.

Born in Barawa, Somalia, he was first elected to the National Assembly of Kenya at the 1992 elections by winning the Lamu East Constituency seat on a KANU ticket. He reclaimed the seat at the 2002 elections, still representing KANU. In the 2007 parliamentary election he retained the seat, but now on a Party of National Unity ticket.

References

1947 births
Living people
Members of the Senate of Kenya
Kenya African National Union politicians
Party of National Unity (Kenya) politicians
Members of the National Assembly (Kenya)
University of Milan alumni